Razorfish may refer to:

Species

Fish
A common name used for three unrelated groups of fishes:
 The genera Aeoliscus, and Centriscus, also known as shrimpfishes, in the family Centriscidae
 The genus Xyrichtys of the family Labridae
 The species Aeoliscus strigatus

Bivalves
 The razor shell Ensis arcuatus, sometimes called razor fish
 Pinna, a genus of bivalve molluscs belonging to the family Pinnidae

Other uses
 Razorfish (company), an advertising agency

See also
 Razor surgeonfish